Troy Dunn is an American television personality, producer, and public speaker who specializes in creating and producing television that generally includes reuniting people with long-lost loved ones.

Biography
Dunn was the executive producer and star of the television show The Locator, which ran five seasons on the cable network WE. In 2013, the cable network TNT announced it was producing a  similar program for which he would be executive producer and host, APB with Troy Dunn. In 2015, he was the host and executive producer of the UPTV show "Last Hope With Troy Dunn".

In 2002, Dunn sold his company BigHugs.com to Ancestry.com.

Dunn is a senior partner in a leadership-training company.
His books include "Young Bucks", "It's Never Too Late" and "Family: The Good 'F' Word", published by Bird Street Books.

Dunn is co-founder of a publishing company, Aylesbury Publishing.

As of 2012, Troy said on episode 600 of the Dr.  Phil show that he had been married almost 25 years. He said he had eight children, six boys and two girls.

References

External links
Profile of Troy Dunn

Living people
American businesspeople
American television personalities
Year of birth missing (living people)